Benjamin Todd Roethlisberger Sr. (born March 2, 1982), nicknamed "Big Ben", is an American former football quarterback who played in the National Football League (NFL) for 18 seasons with the Pittsburgh Steelers. He played college football at Miami (OH) and was selected by the Steelers in the first round of the 2004 NFL Draft.

Roethlisberger earned the AP NFL Offensive Rookie of the Year Award in 2004 and his first Pro Bowl selection in 2007. In 2006, he became the youngest Super Bowl–winning quarterback in NFL history, leading the Steelers, in his second season, to a 21–10 victory over the Seattle Seahawks in Super Bowl XL at the age of 23. Roethlisberger led the Steelers to a second Super Bowl title in four seasons as they defeated the Arizona Cardinals in Super Bowl XLIII, 27–23, after completing a game-winning touchdown pass to Santonio Holmes with 35 seconds left in the game. He appeared in his third Super Bowl in Super Bowl XLV, but the team lost by a score of 31–25 to the Green Bay Packers.

Roethlisberger was one of the most prolific passers in NFL history. Upon retirement, he ranked 5th all-time in NFL career passing yards (64,088), 8th all-time in touchdowns (418), and 5th in completions (5,440) among quarterbacks with a minimum of 1,500 career attempts. He also had the fourth-highest career winning percentage (.710) as a starter in the regular season among quarterbacks with a minimum of 100 starts and was one of six quarterbacks in NFL history to have beaten at least 31 of the current 32 NFL teams.

Known for playing outside the passing pocket in what he calls "backyard football", Roethlisberger grew up idolizing John Elway and has often been compared to him, wearing number 7 in his honor.

High school career
At Findlay High School in Findlay, Ohio, Roethlisberger was captain of the Trojans' football, basketball, and baseball teams. Roethlisberger did not play quarterback until his senior year, giving way to the coach's son, Ryan Hite. Instead, Roethlisberger played wide receiver. "I'm a nationally known knucklehead in many people's eyes," Hite conceded in a 2004 interview to the Toledo Blade but insisted his decision had not been an act of nepotism, or miscalculation.  "We did a bunch of drills and my son throwing to Ben was a better combination," he said.

Ken Roethlisberger, a former Georgia Tech quarterback, never publicly criticized Hite for playing Ryan ahead of his son Ben. He has stated, "It was a coach's call. You make good ones, you make bad ones. And I'm not even saying this was a bad one. We can say it was now, but how do we know for sure?" Ryan Hite went on to Denison University where, as a wide receiver, set numerous career and single-season records by the time he graduated from college.

College career

2000–2001 seasons

Roethlisberger played college quarterback at Miami University in Oxford, Ohio. After arriving at Miami in 2000, he was redshirted his first season. In the 2001 season, he made his collegiate debut against Michigan, completing 18 of 35 passes for 193 yards and two touchdowns in the 31–13 loss. Against Akron, he broke the school single-game passing record with 399 passing yards, with 70 of those yards coming on a Hail Mary to Eddie Tillitz to win the game by a score of 30–27 as time expired. When Miami played Bowling Green, he had two touchdowns and 305 passing yards and broke the MAC freshman passing yardage record in the 24–21 victory. Against Hawaii, he broke school records for attempts, completions, and yardage, when he went 40 of 53 for 452 yards and three touchdowns in the 52–51 loss. He finished his first year with the Redhawks with 3,105 passing yards, 241 completions, and 25 touchdown completions while leading them to a 7–5 record.

2002 season

Roethlisberger's second season as the RedHawks starter was marked with a 7–5 record once again. He broke the MAC single-game record for passing yards in a 48–41 loss against Northern Illinois on October 12 when he threw for 525 yards and four touchdowns. He won the MAC East Special Teams Player of the Week for three punts that landed inside the 20 in the 27–13 victory over Toledo. He established the Miami single-season record with 3,238 passing yards and 271 completions in 2002.

2003 season

After starting the season with a loss to the Iowa Hawkeyes, Roethlisberger led the Miami RedHawks to an unbeaten record in the MAC, 12 consecutive wins, a #10 ranking in the Associated Press poll, and a 49–28 victory over Louisville in the 2003 GMAC Bowl. He finished his 2003 season with a conference-leading 343 completions, 4,486 passing yards, and 37 passing touchdowns, breaking school single-season records in all three categories. He was named as the MAC Offensive Player of the Year for the 2003 season.

His jersey number number 7 was retired by the RedHawks during homecoming on October 13, 2007; the festivities included the RedHawks football game against Bowling Green. Roethlisberger became the third athlete in Miami football history to have his number retired, joining John Pont and Bob Hitchens. Roethlisberger's number being retired was the first time in 34 years Miami retired a football jersey number.

Statistics

Miami Redhawks records
All records are from the Miami University 2008 media guide.

 Most games in a season w/200+ yards passing – 14 (2003; NCAA record)
 Consecutive games in a season w/200+ yards passing – 14 (2003; NCAA record)
 Most pass attempts, career – 1,304 (2001–03)
 Most pass attempts, season – 495 (2003)
 Most pass completions, career – 854 (2001–03)
 Most pass completions, season – 342 (2003)
 Most pass completions, game – 41
 Most passing yards, career – 10,829 (2001–03)
 Most passing yards, season – 4,486 (2003)
 Most passing yards, game – 525
 Most passing touchdowns, career – 84 (2001–03)
 Most passing touchdowns, season – 37 (2003)
 Most passing touchdowns, game – 5
 Most total offense yards, career – 11,075 (2001–03)
 Most total offense yards, season – 4,597 (2003)
 Most total offense yards, game – 485
 Most 300+ yard passing games – 14
 Most 400+ yard passing games – 4
 Most games w/ 4+ touchdown passes – 7
 Highest completion %, career (Min. 300 attempts) – 65.5% (2001–03)
 Highest completion %, season (Min. 100 attempts) – 69.1% (2003)

Professional career

Because ESPN began broadcasting MAC games on Tuesdays and Wednesdays—days without other football on television—in 2000, nationwide "MACtion" audiences watched Roethlisberger's teams. The success of the 2003 Miami Redhawks led to the expectation that he would be drafted early. At the combine, Roethlisberger scored a 25 on the Wonderlic. During the GMAC Bowl, commentators discussed some of his skills that would translate to success in the NFL. Roethlisberger was one of the players invited to attend the draft along with others in the "Green Room" and was featured on the show Hey Rookie, Welcome to the NFL.

During the 2004 NFL Draft, Roethlisberger was the second-highest touted quarterback behind Ole Miss' Eli Manning. He was projected to be taken by the New York Giants as the fourth overall pick, with the San Diego Chargers taking Manning first overall. While the Chargers drafted Manning, the Giants instead selected NC State quarterback Philip Rivers as part of a trade deal that sent Manning to the Giants and Rivers to the Chargers. The Pittsburgh Steelers selected Roethlisberger 11th overall, making him the highest-drafted quarterback to play for the team that picked him, and the highest draft pick the Steelers used on a quarterback since selecting Terry Bradshaw first overall in 1970.

The Steelers almost didn't select Roethlisberger, as head coach Bill Cowher and director of football operations Kevin Colbert had planned to select Arkansas guard Shawn Andrews. However, Steelers owner Dan Rooney overrode both Cowher and Colbert upon seeing that Roethlisberger was still available and the Steelers not wanting a repeat of passing on a franchise quarterback, as they had done in the 1983 NFL Draft when they drafted Gabriel Rivera while local product Dan Marino was still available. Roethlisberger was being interviewed live on ESPN by Suzy Kolber when he received the phone call from Cowher, confirming his selection before it was officially announced by Paul Tagliabue.

Roethlisberger was one of 17 quarterbacks taken in the 2004 NFL Draft, along with Manning and Rivers. All three would enjoy lengthy and successful careers with the teams that signed them and have been compared favorably to the aforementioned 1983 Draft, which included Hall of Fame quarterbacks John Elway, Jim Kelly, and Marino. A two-time Super Bowl winner and six-time Pro Bowler, Roethlisberger leads the three in wins, winning percentage, and postseason appearances, and had the longest career among them.

2004 season

On August 4, Roethlisberger signed a six-year contract to the Steelers worth $22.26 million in salaries and bonuses, with an additional $17.73 million available via incentives. He was touted by Steelers head coach Bill Cowher in a press conference as a franchise quarterback.

He started his rookie season as the third quarterback on the depth chart behind veterans Tommy Maddox and Charlie Batch. When Batch was injured in the preseason, however, Roethlisberger took over the backup quarterback role. Maddox started, and won, the season opener against the Oakland Raiders and started versus the Baltimore Ravens, but after an ineffective outing and third-quarter injury to Maddox, Roethlisberger stepped in for his first NFL action. Despite spurring a mild comeback, the Steelers lost to the Ravens by a score of 30–13. In his regular season debut against the Ravens, Roethlisberger completed 12 of 20 passes for 176-yards and two touchdowns, and two interceptions. During the game, he threw his first career touchdown, on a three-yard pass to Antwaan Randle El and also threw his first career interception to Ravens linebacker Adalius Thomas. Maddox's injury changed the Steelers' original plan for Roethlisberger, which was for him to sit on the bench or play sparingly during the first season or two in order to learn the team's system. Instead, he started the third game of the season against the Miami Dolphins, finishing the 13–3 victory with 12 of 22 completions, 163 passing yards, one touchdown, and an interception. In Week 6, in a 24–20 victory over the Dallas Cowboys, he was 21 of 25 for 193 passing yards and two touchdowns to earn his first AFC Offensive Player of the Week honor.

As a rookie, he went 13–0 in the regular season (14–1 including playoffs) as a starting quarterback, helping the Steelers become the first AFC team to have 15 wins (2–1 under Maddox [first two and last game], 13–0 under Roethlisberger) in a single regular season, surpassing former Steeler Mike Kruczek for the record for the best start by a rookie (6–0) and exceeding the mark for total wins as a rookie, set by Chris Chandler and Joe Ferguson. On January 5, Roethlisberger was unanimously selected as the NFL Offensive Rookie of the Year by the Associated Press, the first quarterback in 34 years to be so honored. In addition, he was named to the NFL All-Rookie Team.

On October 31, he had one of his biggest games, leading the Steelers to a 34–20 victory over the defending Super Bowl champion and previously undefeated New England Patriots, ending their NFL-record 21-game winning streak. He completed 18 of 24 pass attempts for 196 yards, two touchdowns, and no turnovers. The next game, the Steelers defeated the also previously undefeated Philadelphia Eagles 27–3, with Roethlisberger going 11 of 18 for 183 yards, with two touchdowns and one interception.

On December 5, he led the Steelers to a 17–16 victory over the Jacksonville Jaguars. He was near-perfect on the night, completing 14 of 17 passes for 226 yards and two touchdowns. Jeff Reed's 37-yard field goal in the final minute gave the Steelers and Roethlisberger their tenth straight win.

Two weeks later, Roethlisberger faced off against the New York Giants and the first overall pick of the 2004 draft, Eli Manning. Roethlisberger posted his first career 300-yard passing game, with 18 of 28 passes for 316 yards and a touchdown. He led his fifth game-winning drive of the season, capping a drive with a Jerome Bettis touchdown run for a 33–30 victory. Eli Manning threw an interception with 3:19 remaining to seal the game for Pittsburgh.

In the Divisional Round of the playoffs against the New York Jets, Roethlisberger threw two interceptions. One interception was returned for a touchdown, and the other was thrown with 2:03 left in the fourth quarter, which set up a potential game-winning field goal by Jets kicker Doug Brien. Brien missed the kick as time expired (his second missed kick in the last two minutes of the game), forcing the game into overtime. In overtime, Roethlisberger led the Steelers down the field and put them in position for the game-winning field goal, a 33-yard attempt that was made by Jeff Reed, sending the Steelers into the AFC Championship for the fourth time in 10 years.

On January 23 in the AFC Championship Game in Pittsburgh, Roethlisberger completed 14 of 24 pass attempts for 226 yards and two touchdowns, but he also threw three costly interceptions, one of which was returned 87 yards for a touchdown by Rodney Harrison. The Steelers lost the game to the eventual Super Bowl champions, the New England Patriots, by a score of 41–27.

2005 season: First Super Bowl championship

In the 2005 regular season, the Steelers finished with an 11–5 record. After securing an AFC Wild Card spot en route to victory in the Super Bowl, the Steelers pulled off upsets at Indianapolis and Denver in the AFC playoffs in addition to wins over the higher seed Cincinnati Bengals and Seattle Seahawks.

During the course of the regular 2005 season, Roethlisberger missed four games due to various knee injuries. The Steelers went 9–3 with Roethlisberger at quarterback and 2–2 without him. He led the league in Yards Per Attempt with an 8.90, and finished third in passer rating behind Peyton Manning and Carson Palmer with a 98.6.

The Super Bowl run began on January 8 as Roethlisberger helped lead the Steelers to a Divisional Round playoff win over the Cincinnati Bengals—an AFC North rival that had beaten the Steelers by seven points in the regular season to win the division championship. The rematch featured two teams with identical records, having split their regular season series since each team won on the road. Early in the game on Carson Palmer's first throw, a tackle by former Bengal Kimo von Oelhoffen resulted in Palmer's anterior cruciate ligament (ACL) being completely torn. The Bengals' backup quarterback, Jon Kitna, came in and led the Bengals to leads of 10–0 and 17–7. However, the 17–7 lead midway through the second quarter was the last time in the 2005 postseason that the Steelers trailed an opponent by more than three points. After Kitna failed to produce, the Steelers took advantage by taking the next 24 straight points, and the win, in a 31–17 victory in Cincinnati.

Their second road win came on January 15 when Roethlisberger led the Steelers against the Indianapolis Colts in the Divisional Round, the NFL's top team throughout the season and a heavy favorite to represent the AFC in Super Bowl XL. Roethlisberger threw for 197 yards and recorded a game-saving tackle on Colts' defensive back Nick Harper, who had just recovered a Jerome Bettis fumble with less than two minutes left in the game. Pittsburgh led early but had to survive a Colts comeback to win 21–18, after an errant call that the NFL later admitted was a mistake, which overturned a Troy Polamalu interception that would have secured the game for the Steelers. Roethlisberger's tackle on Harper, dubbed by many as The Tackle II or The Immaculate Redemption, was compared by many to "The Immaculate Reception" in 1972, when Franco Harris made a miraculous reception and scored the game-winning touchdown against the Oakland Raiders. The victory marked the first time in playoff history that a sixth-seeded NFL playoff team defeated the top-seeded team.

On January 22, 2006, the Steelers defeated the Denver Broncos by a score of 34–17 in Denver to win the AFC Championship and advance to Super Bowl XL. Roethlisberger completed 21 of 29 passes for 275 yards and threw two touchdown passes and scored one touchdown himself on a four-yard play-action bootleg. His run was the last touchdown of the game, sealing the win for the Steelers.

The Steelers won Super Bowl XL 21–10 over the Seattle Seahawks in Detroit on February 5. Roethlisberger had one of the worst passing games of his career, completing just nine of 21 passes for 123 yards and two interceptions; his passer rating of 22.6 was the lowest in Super Bowl history by a winning quarterback. Though he did convert eight third-down situations in the game to help the Steelers win, none of them was bigger than his 37-yard pass to Super Bowl XL MVP Hines Ward on a third-and-28 that set up the Steelers' first touchdown (a one-yard quarterback sneak by Roethlisberger on third and goal). With the victory, Roethlisberger, at 23 years old, became the youngest quarterback to win the Super Bowl, a record previously held by Tom Brady of the New England Patriots.

2006 season

After an off-season motorcycle crash in which he was seriously injured, Roethlisberger missed the opening game of the 2006 season after having an emergency appendectomy on September 3. Backup Charlie Batch started and led the Steelers to a victory over the Miami Dolphins. Roethlisberger played the following game against the Jacksonville Jaguars. His return resulted in a sub-par performance as he threw two interceptions with no touchdowns in a 9–0 loss. In Week 3, Roethlisberger completed fewer than half of his passes for three interceptions and no touchdowns in a 28–20 loss to the Cincinnati Bengals. The final interception came in the final seconds of the game, in the end zone, ending Pittsburgh's comeback attempt.

In Week 5 against the San Diego Chargers, Roethlisberger looked sharp throughout the first half, leading three scoring drives. However, in the second half, he threw two interceptions, both of which shifted momentum away from the Steelers and led to the Chargers' 23–13 win. In Week 6 against the Kansas City Chiefs, Roethlisberger had his first big game of the season, completing 16 of 19 passes for 238 yards with two touchdowns (his first of the year) and no interceptions during a 45–7 rout of the Chiefs. During Week 7 in Atlanta, Roethlisberger continued his success, going 16 of 22 for 237 yards and three touchdowns. However, during the third quarter, Roethlisberger was helped off the field after sustaining a concussion following a controversial hit by Falcons defensive end Patrick Kerney. Roethlisberger was replaced by Charlie Batch, and the Steelers went on to lose 41–38 in overtime.

On October 29 against the Oakland Raiders, Roethlisberger threw four interceptions in a 20–13 upset loss. The loss was his fifth of the season—two more than he had in his first two seasons combined as a starter—and gave him a total of 11 interceptions, versus just six touchdowns, on the season. In a Week 9 rematch of the 2005 AFC Championship against the Denver Broncos, Roethlisberger threw for a career-high 433 yards but had three of the six Steelers turnovers in a 31–20 loss. Roethlisberger and the Steelers got back on a winning track in a home game a week later against the New Orleans Saints. He passed for 265 yards and three touchdowns in a 38–31 win.

In Week 11, Roethlisberger overcame three first-half interceptions by throwing for 224 yards and two touchdowns in the fourth quarter, leading the Steelers to score 21 points and come back to beat the Cleveland Browns, 24–20. The following week, Roethlisberger and the Steelers were held scoreless in a 27–0 loss to the Baltimore Ravens. Roethlisberger finished 21 of 41 for 214 yards and two interceptions. He was sacked nine times, including once by Ravens linebacker Bart Scott, which sent him to the sidelines briefly. He also fumbled once, which the Ravens returned for a touchdown in the second half. Roethlisberger bounced back the following game, throwing for 198 yards and two touchdowns in a 20–3 victory over the Tampa Bay Buccaneers.

Pittsburgh kept their playoff hopes alive in Week 14 with a 27–7 victory against the Browns. Roethlisberger went 11 of 21 for 225 yards with one touchdown, and rushed for one more. In Week 15, Roethlisberger threw for 140 yards and a touchdown in a 37–3 rout of the Carolina Panthers. The following week, Baltimore eliminated Pittsburgh from the playoffs. In the 31–7 defeat, Roethlisberger was intercepted twice and threw for 156 yards.

Roethlisberger ended the season on a good note by defeating the Cincinnati Bengals by a score of 23–17 in overtime and eliminating them from playoff contention in what was Bill Cowher's final game as the Steelers' head coach. He was 19 for 28 passing with 280 yards, one touchdown, and one interception. In overtime, Roethlisberger completed a slant pass to rookie Santonio Holmes, who went 67 yards for the game-winning touchdown.

2007 season

In Week 1 against the Cleveland Browns, Roethlisberger threw four touchdown passes in a game for the first time in his NFL career as he led the Steelers to a win in the debut of new Steelers head coach Mike Tomlin. Against the Arizona Cardinals in Week 4, Roethlisberger looked to get a win over his former offensive coordinator Ken Whisenhunt, who was then the head coach of the Cardinals. However, Roethlisberger had his first loss of the season as he was intercepted twice; once in the red zone, and then on a desperation pass with six seconds left in the game.

In Week 9 against the Baltimore Ravens, Roethlisberger passed for a career-high five touchdown passes, which tied the team record held by Terry Bradshaw and Mark Malone. All five touchdowns were thrown in the first half, making Roethlisberger one of two quarterbacks in the 2007 season (the other being Tom Brady), and only the fifth quarterback since the 1970 merger, to accomplish such a feat. He also posted a perfect 158.3 passer rating. Against the Browns in Week 10, Roethlisberger helped the Steelers erase a 15-point deficit against the rival Browns in a 31–28 victory. He passed for 278 yards, two touchdowns, and one interception to earn AFC Offensive Player of the Week.

In Week 12 against the Miami Dolphins, Roethlisberger set a Steelers record, completing 85.7% of his passes (18 of 21) as the Steelers beat the Miami Dolphins, 3–0—a feat made all the more remarkable given the weather conditions. Pittsburgh was hit with a torrential storm, delaying the Monday night game 30 minutes due to lightning, while turning the new sod on the field, laid earlier that week, into a soggy mess. In many parts of the field, players sunk several inches with each step. After one of the game's punts, the ball infamously stood straight up, stuck in the ground upon impact. With the game scoreless in the fourth quarter, Roethlisberger led a game-winning field goal drive for the only points of the night.

Roethlisberger threw his 29th touchdown pass of the season in Week 15 against the Jacksonville Jaguars, breaking the team single-season touchdown pass record previously held by Bradshaw. In Week 16 against the St. Louis Rams, Roethlisberger became the first quarterback in NFL history to have two perfect passer rating (158.3) games in the same regular season, completing 16 of 20 passes for 261 yards and three touchdowns. It was his third career-perfect passer rating game, tying Peyton Manning for the most such regular-season games in NFL history. He earned his second AFC Offensive Player of the Week nod for the 2007 season.

To cap his comeback season, Roethlisberger was selected to his first Pro Bowl, joining five other Steelers teammates on the AFC squad. Roethlisberger's 32 touchdown passes ranked third in the NFL, behind Tony Romo and Tom Brady, while his 104.1 passer rating was second only to Brady. Roethlisberger also set a new Steelers single-season record with 32 touchdown passes.

In a rematch of the Week 15 game, the Steelers were defeated by the Jaguars in the AFC Wild Card Round, 31–29. In the loss, Roethlisberger passed for 337 yards, two touchdowns, and three interceptions. Roethlisberger finished third in Comeback Player of the Year voting, behind the Patriots' Randy Moss and the Dallas Cowboys' Greg Ellis, who won the award. Roethlisberger played in his first Pro Bowl in Hawaii.

2008 season: Second Super Bowl championship

On March 4, 2008, the Pittsburgh Steelers and Roethlisberger agreed to an eight-year, $102 million contract. Roethlisberger had two years left on his original that he signed after the draft. He has stated that he wants to retire as a Steeler.

In Week 1 against the Houston Texans, Roethlisberger completed 13 of 14 passes for a career-high 92.9 completion percentage (minimum 10 attempts), and finished with 137 yards passing and two touchdown passes in the 38–17 win. Byron Leftwich took over in the fourth quarter when Roethlisberger was on the sideline with a shoulder injury. The next week against the Cleveland Browns, he had the first pass reception of his career: a negative-seven-yard completion to himself after a deflected pass in the second quarter. In a 15–6 loss to the Philadelphia Eagles in Week 3, Roethlisberger was sacked eight times, fumbled twice, threw one interception, and was called for a safety in the fourth quarter. He did not finish the game, as his throwing hand was injured.

In Week 4 against the Baltimore Ravens, the Steelers trailed 13–3 at halftime. Roethlisberger threw a touchdown pass to Santonio Holmes in the third quarter to start a comeback. He completed two passes to Mewelde Moore for 31 yards in overtime, setting up Jeff Reed for the winning 46-yard field goal. The next week, Roethlisberger threw for 239 yards in the first half—a career-high for one half—and directed the game-winning drive, passing for an eight-yard touchdown to Hines Ward to defeat the Jacksonville Jaguars by a score of 26–21. He was named AFC Offensive Player of the Week and the FedEx Air Player of the Week for his performance.

Roethlisberger had one of the worst performances of his career in a Week 9 23–6 win over the Washington Redskins, posting career lows in passer rating (15.1), completions (5), passing yards (50), yards per attempt (2.94) and completion percentage (29.4%). In Week 13 at New England, in consistent rain, Roethlisberger completed 17 of 33 passes for 179 yards, two touchdowns, and one interception. After falling behind, 10–3, in the second quarter, Roethlisberger led the Steelers to 30 unanswered points in a 33–10 victory.

Against the Dallas Cowboys in Week 14, Roethlisberger had his 49th victory as a starting quarterback, breaking the record for the most wins by a quarterback in their first five NFL seasons. The Steelers clinched the AFC North in Week 15 with a win over the Baltimore Ravens, and with a loss to the Tennessee Titans the following week clinched the No. 2 seed in the playoffs. The Steelers defeated the San Diego Chargers in the Divisional Round and the Baltimore Ravens in the AFC Championship en route to the Super Bowl.

In Super Bowl XLIII against the Arizona Cardinals, Roethlisberger led the Steelers to one of the more dramatic victories in Super Bowl history. On the first two offensive drives, Roethlisberger passed for 122 yards on seven of eight passing attempts, which was one yard shy of his total amount from his first Super Bowl start. The Steelers led, 10–0, and went into halftime up, 17–7. The lead grew to 20–7 before Arizona mounted a comeback. Trailing for the first time in the game, 23–20, with 2:30 remaining in the game, Roethlisberger took the field to start the winning drive. After a holding penalty on the first play, Roethlisberger marched the Steelers 88 yards in eight plays, hooking up with game MVP Santonio Holmes four times for 73 yards on the drive, including the six-yard touchdown pass that put the Steelers ahead with 0:35 remaining. Overall, Roethlisberger finished 21 of 30 for 256 yards, one touchdown, and one interception. He had a passer rating of 93.2.

2009 season

In Week 3 against the Cincinnati Bengals, the Steelers were dominant in the first half and led, 20–9, in the fourth quarter, but the defense surrendered the lead with 14 seconds left. Roethlisberger got the ball back with two seconds remaining and his Hail Mary attempt was incomplete. It is his first NFL loss in the state of Ohio, snapping an 11–0 record. He improved his record of 10–0 against the Cleveland Browns by throwing for 417 yards and 2 touchdowns in Week 6. In Week 11 against the Kansas City Chiefs, he had thrown for 398 yards and three touchdowns before leaving the game in overtime after taking a knee to the helmet on a scramble attempt. He suffered the fourth concussion of his NFL career. After sitting out the overtime loss in Week 12 at Baltimore, Roethlisberger started against the Oakland Raiders in Week 13 and passed for 278 yards and two touchdown passes. He threw a go-ahead touchdown pass to Hines Ward with 1:56 remaining, only to have the Raiders answer back with a winning touchdown with nine seconds left. The Steelers could not hold three leads in the fourth quarter. They led 10–6, 17–13 and 24–20. It was the fifth loss of the season in which they surrendered the lead in the final quarter.

On a frigid Thursday night in Cleveland in Week 14, Roethlisberger was sacked 8 times and did not lead a touchdown drive in his first career loss to Cleveland, ending a perfect 10–0 record against the rival Browns. It is the first time he lost four straight starts.

In Week 15 against the Green Bay Packers, Roethlisberger broke several franchise passing records in ending the five-game losing streak for the Steelers with the biggest passing day in franchise history. His first pass of the day was a 60-yard touchdown to Mike Wallace, and his last pass was a game-winning 19-yard touchdown to Wallace on the final play of the game. He passed for 503 yards, three touchdowns, and had no turnovers. He broke Terry Bradshaw's single-season record of 3,724 passing yards, and set a new mark for single-season completions (302). After leading a FG drive to take a 30–28 lead, the defense again surrendered the lead and the Steelers trailed, 36–30. Roethlisberger used all 2:01 he had left to drive the team 86 yards for the winning touchdown with no time remaining. Roethlisberger was named AFC Player of the Week for his effort; the fifth time he has won that award in his career.

In Week 16 against the Baltimore Ravens, Roethlisberger's 259-yard effort helped him become the first quarterback in franchise history to pass for over 4,000 yards in a single season. With the game tied at 20 in the final quarter, he led the Steelers on the game-winning field goal drive as they improved to 8–7.

Roethlisberger finished the season with 4,328 yards and 26 touchdown passes. He was 9–6 as a starter and his 100.5 passer rating was the second time in his career he had a season with a rating over 100. He was sacked 50 times in 2009. Despite the three game win streak to end the season, the Steelers did not make the playoffs after tie-breakers eliminated them. Roethlisberger was voted as team MVP by the Steelers for the first time in his career. He was selected as the first alternate to the Pro Bowl, but declined the invitation to rest his right shoulder which was injured in the Miami game.

2010 season: Third Super Bowl appearance

In Week 6 against the Cleveland Browns, after being suspended for the first four games of the season under the NFL player conduct policy, Roethlisberger returned to the Steelers. In his first game of the season he completed 16 of 27 passes for 258 yards, three touchdowns, and one interception.

In Week 7 against the Miami Dolphins, with the Steelers trailing, 22–20, with 2:37 remaining in the game, Roethlisberger was at the center of controversy when he ran a QB draw and dove for the end zone, appearing to score a touchdown in the process. The play was ruled a touchdown on the field, but reviews showed Roethlisberger had fumbled short of the end zone. However, the review failed to provide conclusive evidence as to who recovered the ball after the fumble. By rule, possession was given to Pittsburgh, resulting in the game-winning field goal. Roethlisberger passed for 302 yards and 2 touchdowns in the game. "Just a bizarre kind of play. You hate to win it that way, but you'll take a win," Roethlisberger said.

In Week 8 against the New Orleans Saints, Roethlisberger, playing in his 90th regular season game, reached the 20,000-yard passing mark, but failed to throw a touchdown pass as the Steelers lost on Halloween night in the Superdome. Roethlisberger improved to 8–2 as a starter on Monday Night Football in Week 9 against the Cincinnati Bengals, and 63–27 over his first 90 regular season starts (tied with Jim McMahon for third-highest win percentage through a player's first 90 starts). Roethlisberger passed for a season-high 387 yards and 3 touchdowns in the Week 10, 39–26 loss, to the New England Patriots, but also had an interception returned for a score and was sacked five times as he tried to rally the Steelers from a 23–3 deficit in the second half.

In his first win over the Oakland Raiders in Week 11, Roethlisberger passed for 275 yards and three touchdowns, and rushed for a career-high 55 yards and a touchdown. Celebrating a second-quarter touchdown pass, Roethlisberger was punched in the face by Raiders' defensive lineman Richard Seymour, who was then ejected. Roethlisberger was questionable to start the Week 13 game against the Baltimore Ravens with a foot injury, but did start the game and suffered a broken nose on the first series after a hit to the face from Haloti Ngata. Trailing 10–6 in the fourth quarter, Roethlisberger threw a go-ahead touchdown pass to Isaac Redman with 2:51 remaining and the Steelers held on for the 13–10 win as he finished with 253 yards passing.

In Week 17 against the Cleveland Browns, the Steelers clinched the AFC North and the #2 seed in the AFC playoffs. In the 41–9 victory, he finished with 280 passing yards and two touchdowns to earn AFC Offensive Player of the Week. He finished the season with a 9–3 record in 12 starts, passing for 3,200 yards, 17 touchdowns and a career-low five interceptions.

Late in the first quarter of the AFC Divisional Round against the Baltimore Ravens, Roethlisberger was sacked and fumbled the ball, and after both teams thought the pass was incomplete, it was eventually picked up by Cory Redding for a Baltimore touchdown. The Steelers trailed, 21–7, in the third quarter before Roethlisberger completed touchdown passes to Heath Miller and Hines Ward to tie the game at 21. With just over two minutes left, the game was tied, 24–24, and the Steelers faced a 3rd and 19. Roethlisberger completed a deep pass to rookie wide receiver Antonio Brown for 58 yards and Rashard Mendenhall's rushing touchdown put the Steelers ahead for good, 31–24, with 1:33 left. It was Roethlisberger's third game-winning drive in a playoff game. He finished with 19 completions on 32 attempts for 226 yards and 2 touchdown passes.

In the AFC Championship against the New York Jets, Roethlisberger rushed for a touchdown in the first half as the Steelers built a 24–0 lead, before the Jets scored 19 unanswered points. With two minutes remaining in the game, Roethlsiberger faced a 3rd and 6. He scrambled right and completed a 14-yard pass to Antonio Brown to seal the victory for Pittsburgh, sending them to their third Super Bowl appearance in the last six seasons. Roethlisberger completed 10 of 19 passes for a season-low 133 yards and two interceptions in the 28–21 victory.

In Super Bowl XLV against the Green Bay Packers, Roethlisberger was hit as he attempted a pass to Mike Wallace in the first quarter, and it was intercepted for a touchdown by Nick Collins. The Steelers trailed, 21–3, in the second quarter before Roethlisberger completed a touchdown pass to Hines Ward to make it 21–10 at halftime. The Steelers closed to within 21–17 in the third quarter, but were unable to score on their next three drives. After falling behind, 28–17, in the fourth quarter, Roethlisberger threw a 25-yard touchdown pass to Mike Wallace, and then pitched the ball to Antwaan Randle El on an option run for the two-point conversion to make it 28–25. Taking over at his own 13 with 1:59 left and down 31–25, Roethlisberger was unable to lead the game-winning drive against Green Bay this time after his pass fell incomplete to Wallace on 4th and 5 at his own 33-yard line, ensuring the first Super Bowl loss of his career. Roethlisberger finished the 31–25 loss 25 of 40 for 263 yards, 2 touchdowns and 2 interceptions. "I feel like I let the city of Pittsburgh down, the fans, my coaches and my teammates," Roethlisberger said, "and it's not a good feeling." In the off-season, he was ranked 41st by his fellow players on the NFL Top 100 Players of 2011.

2011 season

In Week 1 against the Baltimore Ravens, Roethlisberger set career-worsts for turnovers (5) and largest margin of defeat (28) in his first loss against the Ravens since 2006. In Week 2 against the Seattle Seahawks, he became the fourth quarterback to reach 70 wins in his first 100 starts, as he threw for 298 yards and did not turn the ball over. He took a shot to his right knee in the second quarter, but returned after missing two plays to finish the game.

In a 23–20 Week 3 win against the Indianapolis Colts, Roethlisberger threw for a career-high 171 yards in the first quarter, turned the ball over three times in the second quarter, then led the Steelers to the 20th fourth quarter comeback of his career, passing Terry Bradshaw for the most in Steelers' history. In Week 5 against the Tennessee Titans, Roethlisberger threw five touchdown passes for the second time in his career. He earned AFC Offensive Player of the Week honors for the seventh time in his career. In Week 7 against the Arizona Cardinals, Roethlisberger set the franchise record for longest pass with a 95-yard touchdown pass to Mike Wallace. He finished with 361 yards and 3 touchdowns in his first regular season win over the Cardinals. Roethlisberger beat the Tom Brady-led Patriots for the first time in seven years in Week 8, completing 36 of 50 passes for 365 yards and 2 touchdowns. He was named AFC Offensive Player of the Week for the eighth time in his career. In Week 12 against the Kansas City Chiefs, Roethlisberger's career-best streak of 18 consecutive games with 200+ yards passing came to an end as he finished with 193. In Week 13 against the Cincinnati Bengals, Roethlisberger moved past Terry Bradshaw in the Steelers' record books; first for most times sacked, then for most pass completions in team history.

In the second quarter of the Week 14 game against the Cleveland Browns, Roethlisberger's leg was injured on a sack and he left the game. He returned for the second half and played the rest of the game, despite limping on his high-ankle sprain. He threw a game-clinching 79-yard touchdown pass to Antonio Brown late in the fourth quarter as the Steelers won 14–3. Roethlisberger finished with 280 yards passing on just 21 attempts for a career-high 13.33 YPA (min. 15 attempts). On the injury, Roethlisberger said, "It was one of the most painful things I ever felt. It felt like the middle of my leg was just, cracked ... it felt like my foot was outside of my leg." In Week 15 against the San Francisco 49ers, Roethlisberger started the game while suffering through a high-ankle sprain. During the game, it was clear that Roethlisberger was still showing signs of the injury due to him limping between plays. He finished the game without any touchdowns but had 330 yards passing while throwing three interceptions.

Because of Roethlisberger's leg injury from Week 14, the team opted to sit him and start Charlie Batch in the Week 16 game against the St. Louis Rams, giving Roethlisberger more time to recover.

In Week 17 against the Cleveland Browns, just three weeks after the Browns injured Roethlisberger in Pittsburgh, Roethlisberger once again took the field to face the same opponents in their home stadium. The Steelers opted to start Roethlisberger over Batch because of the possibility that Baltimore could drop its final game, and a win by the Steelers would take back the division title. Despite his injury, Mike Tomlin and the coaching staff believed Roethlisberger gave them their best chance at victory. Big Ben completed 23 of 40 passes for 221 yards with no touchdowns or interceptions. Baltimore went on to win their final game and secured the division title, leaving Steelers with the number 5 seed to face Denver in the Wild Card round of the playoffs.

In the Wild Card Round against the Denver Broncos, Roethlisberger and the Steelers offense battled a tough Denver defense, trailing 20–6 at the half but tying it at 23–23 before the end of regulation. The game-tying touchdown came on a 2nd and 10 with 3:47 remaining in regulation, in which Big Ben made a vintage play eluding pass rushers before connecting with Jerricho Cotchery on a 31-yard pass. Despite the heroic efforts of Roethlisberger and company, Tim Tebow's magical season continued with his best single-game performance to date, capped off with an 80-yard completion to Demaryius Thomas to end overtime after one play. Roethlisberger completed 22 of 40 passes for 289 yards, with 1 touchdown and 1 interception in the 29–23 overtime loss to end the 2011 season. He was named to the Pro Bowl for the 2011 season. He finished ranked 30th by his peers on the NFL Top 100 Players of 2012.

2012 season

Roethlisberger threw for 3,265 yards, 26 touchdowns, and 8 interceptions in thirteen games as the Steelers finished the 2012 season with an 8–8 record. One of his best individual games in the 2012 season came against the Oakland Raiders in Week 3. He had 384 passing yards and four touchdowns in the 34–31 loss. He missed three games due to injury, being replaced by Byron Leftwich, who went 0–1, and Charlie Batch, who went 1–1. It was the Steelers first season missing the playoffs since 2009 and their first with a non-winning record since 2006. He finished ranked 61st by his fellow players on the NFL Top 100 Players of 2013.

In 2012, Roethlisberger returned to Miami University to complete his college degree, graduating with a Bachelor of Science in Education on May 6, 2012. Roethlisberger walked with the other graduates at the commencement ceremony, with his parents, grandmother, and wife Ashley in attendance. He had planned on finishing his degree sooner, but the Steelers having deep playoff runs earlier in his career prevented him from registering for classes in time for the winter term, only being able to do it after the Steelers were eliminated in the Wild Card round against the Denver Broncos the previous season. Roethlisberger became the second member of the Steelers in less than a year to return to college and complete his degree, with teammate Polamalu doing the same thing the previous off-season during the 2011 NFL lockout.

2013 season

Roethlisberger threw for 4,261 yards and 28 touchdowns in 16 games in 2013 as the Steelers finished the season with an 8–8 record. In Week 11, in a 37–27 victory over the Detroit Lions, he had 367 passing yards and four touchdowns to earn AFC Offensive Player of the Week. The Steelers would go on to miss the playoffs after the San Diego Chargers defeated the Kansas City Chiefs 27–24 in overtime in Week 17. This would also be the first time they missed the playoffs in back-to-back seasons since 1999 and the first time under Mike Tomlin. Roethlisberger was ranked 31st by his fellow players on the NFL Top 100 Players of 2014.

2014 season

Roesthilsberger started the 2014 season with a 4–3 record in the first seven games. On October 26, 2014, against the Indianapolis Colts, Roethlisberger completed 40 of 49 passes for a career-high 522 yards and six touchdowns as the Steelers defeated the Indianapolis Colts 51–34. With the win, Roethlisberger became just the fourth quarterback in NFL history to get 100 wins in his first 150 starts. He also became the first NFL quarterback to pass for over 500 yards twice in a career. He earned AFC Offensive Player of the Week for his effort against the Colts. In the next game, a 43–23 victory over the Baltimore Ravens, he had 340 passing yards and six passing touchdowns to earn AFC Offensive Player of the Week for the second consecutive week.

In the Steelers Week 15 matchup against the Atlanta Falcons, Roethlisberger completed 27 of 35 passes for 360 yards in a 27–20 victory. The victory made Roethlisberger only the sixth quarterback in NFL history to have defeated at least 31 different teams, joining Tom Brady, Drew Brees, Kerry Collins, Brett Favre, and Peyton Manning; like Brady (at the time), Roethlisberger has only played with one team and thus has not played against the Steelers. The Steelers lost 41–38 in Roethlisberger's only other matchup against Atlanta in 2006, and he was suspended for the Steelers 15–9 overtime victory against the Falcons in 2010.

During 2014, Roethlisberger passed for career highs in yards with 4,952, completion percentage with 67.1, completions with 408, and attempts with 608. Roethlisberger also matched his career high in passing touchdowns with 32, as well as posting a passer rating of 103.3, the second highest of his career. His 4,952 yards were tied for most on the season with Drew Brees, but Roethlisberger reached the mark with fewer completions.

The Steelers had an 11–5 record and finished first in the AFC North. They then lost in the Wild Card Round of the playoffs against the Baltimore Ravens by a score of 30–17. He was named to his third career Pro Bowl for the 2014 season. He was ranked 26th by his fellow players on the NFL Top 100 Players of 2015.

2015 season

On March 13, Roethlisberger signed a five-year contract extension with the Steelers. Roethlisberger went 26 for 38 for 351 yards, one touchdown pass and one interception during a 28–21 loss against the New England Patriots to kick off the 2015 NFL season. However, Roethlisberger and the Steelers won their next two games against the San Francisco 49ers and the St. Louis Rams. In the 43–18 victory over the 49ers, he had 369 passing yards and three touchdowns to earn AFC Offensive Player of the Week.

During the September 27 game against the St. Louis Rams, Roethlisberger suffered a sprained MCL and a bone bruise. Roethlisberger missed the Steelers' next four games, during which Michael Vick and Landry Jones combined to go 2–2.

Roethlisberger sustained another injury against the Oakland Raiders on November 8, 2015, suffering a left mid-foot sprain. Due to this injury, he did not start the following week against the Cleveland Browns, although he was listed as active for the game. However, early in the first quarter, Landry Jones sprained his left ankle, resulting in Roethlisberger entering the game in relief for only the second time in his career. Roethlisberger threw for 379 yards and three touchdowns on the way to a Steelers win and an AFC Offensive Player of the Week award; his 379 passing yards were the most by a quarterback in relief since Don Strock threw for 403 yards for the Miami Dolphins against the San Diego Chargers in the Epic in Miami playoff game in 1982. On November 29, Roethlisberger threw for 456 yards against the Seattle Seahawks, but he also threw two interceptions, and the Seahawks took a 39–30 win.

The Steelers clinched a playoff spot with a 10–6 record, finishing second in the AFC North behind the Cincinnati Bengals. They defeated the Bengals by a score of 18–16 in the Wild Card Round, but lost to the eventual Super Bowl champion Denver Broncos in the Divisional Round by a score of 23–16. Roethlisberger was named to his fourth career Pro Bowl and was ranked 21st by his fellow players on the NFL Top 100 Players of 2016.

2016 season

Roethlisberger started off the 2016 season with a 2–1 record in the first three games. He had back-to-back 300-yard passing performances against the Kansas City Chiefs and New York Jets in Weeks 4–5, and combined for nine touchdowns in that span. For his effort against the Chiefs, he earned AFC Offensive Player of the Week. However, the following week on the road against the Miami Dolphins, Roethlisberger left the game after suffering a knee injury. He underwent surgery on October 17 for a torn meniscus and missed the following week against the New England Patriots. The Steelers made the playoffs, winning the AFC North with an 11–5 record. They defeated the Miami Dolphins by a score of 30–12 in the Wild Card Round and beat the Chiefs 18–16 in the Divisional Round. However, the Steelers lost 36–17 to the Patriots in the AFC Championship. He passed for 314 passing yards, one passing touchdown, and one interception.

Roethlisberger was named to his third consecutive and fifth career Pro Bowl on December 20, 2016, and was ranked 22nd on the NFL Top 100 Players of 2017, just one spot below his ranking from the previous year.

2017 season

Roethlisberger helped lead the Steelers to a 3–1 record to start to the 2017 season. In Week 5 against the Jacksonville Jaguars, Roethlisberger threw a career-high five interceptions as the Steelers lost by a score of 30–9. In Week 11 against the Tennessee Titans, he completed 30 of 45 passes for 299 yards and four touchdowns as the Steelers won 40–17. In that game, Roethlisberger recorded his 4,000th career completion on a three-yard pass to tight end Jesse James. On December 4, Roethlisberger became the eighth quarterback to reach 50,000 career passing yards in a game against the Cincinnati Bengals. In Week 14 against the Baltimore Ravens, he completed 44 of 66 passes (both single-game career highs) for 506 yards and two touchdowns in a 39–38 win, becoming the first player in NFL history with three career 500-yard passing games. With the win, the Steelers clinched a playoff berth and the AFC North title. His 44 completions set an NFL record for the most completions in a non-overtime game and were the second most in NFL history behind Drew Bledsoe's 45 completions in 1994. His performance in Week 14 earned him AFC Offensive Player of the Week.

During Week 15 against the New England Patriots, Roethlisberger finished with 281 passing yards, two touchdowns, and an interception. In the closing seconds of the fourth quarter, two controversial moments occurred; Roethlisberger threw a potential game-winning touchdown to tight end Jesse James, but was overturned after James seemingly lost control when the ball touched the ground. Two plays later, Roethlisberger faked a spike to pass, which was intercepted by Duron Harmon, resulting in the Steelers losing 24–27.

On December 19, 2017, Roethlisberger was named to his fourth consecutive and sixth career Pro Bowl along with his star receiver Antonio Brown and three of his starting offensive lineman among others.

The Steelers finished the 2017 season with a 13–3 record, clinching the AFC North division. In the AFC Divisional Round, the Steelers faced the Jaguars. Although the Jaguars had the #1 passing defense in 2017, Roethlisberger finished with a playoff career-high 469 passing yards, five touchdowns, and an interception, but the Steelers lost 42–45. He was ranked 18th by his fellow players on the NFL Top 100 Players of 2018.

2018 season

Roethlisberger started the 2018 season with 335 passing yards, one touchdown, and three interceptions in a 21–21 tie against the Cleveland Browns. In Week 2, in a 42–37 loss to the Kansas City Chiefs, Roethlisberger passed for 452 yards, three touchdowns, and had a rushing touchdown. He became the third player since 1950 with at least 450 passing yards, three passing touchdowns, and a rushing touchdown in the same game. He passed John Elway for seventh-most passing yards in NFL history. In Week 3, Roethlisberger completed 79% of his passes for 353 yards and three touchdowns in a 30–27 win over the Tampa Bay Buccaneers, earning him AFC Offensive Player of the Week. In Week 10 against the Carolina Panthers, Roethlisberger had more touchdowns than incompletions on a statline of 22-of-25 for 328 yards and five touchdowns in his NFL-record fourth game with a perfect quarterback rating. His performance in Week 10 earned him AFC Offensive Player of the Week for the second time in 2018. In a Week 12 loss to the Denver Broncos, he passed for a season-high 462 yards, one touchdown, and two interceptions. In Week 16, a 31–28 loss to the New Orleans Saints, he passed for 380 yards and three touchdowns in a loss that hurt their playoff chances. Despite a win in Week 17, the Steelers missed the playoffs for the first time since 2013, finishing second in the AFC North with a 9–6–1 record.

Roethlisberger led the league in passing yards (5,129) for the second time in his career. He led the league in completions (452), attempts (675) and interceptions (16). His 5,129 passing yards and 34 touchdown passes set franchise records, both of which were held by Roethlisberger in his 2014 season.

2019 season: Injured reserve

On April 24, 2019, Roethlisberger signed a two-year contract extension with the Steelers worth $68 million with a $37.5 million signing bonus, keeping him under contract through the 2021 season.
In Week 2 against the Seattle Seahawks, Roethlisberger injured his right elbow and was unable to play in the second half of the game. His backup Mason Rudolph relieved him as the Steelers lost 28–26. Subsequently, the team announced the following day that Roethlisberger would be placed on the season ending injured-reserve list after undergoing surgery on his injured elbow. After the season, it was revealed that Roethlisberger's injury was much more serious than originally anticipated, as he tore off three flexor tendons from his throwing arm, and he is believed to be the first quarterback to attempt a comeback from such an injury.

2020 season: Return from injury

Roethlisberger made his return from injury in the Week 1 game against the New York Giants, where he threw for 229 yards and three touchdowns in the 26–16 win. In Week 3 against the Houston Texans, Roethlisberger threw for 237 yards and two touchdowns during the 28–21 win.  During the game, Roethlisberger broke Mike Webster's record for the most games played with the Steelers with 221 games. In Week 5 against the Philadelphia Eagles, Roethlisberger threw for 239 yards and three touchdowns, all to Chase Claypool, during the 38–29 win. With the victory, he helped lead the Steelers to their first 4–0 start since 1979. In Week 9 against the Dallas Cowboys, Roethlisberger threw for 306 yards and three touchdowns during the 24–19 win. The victory over the Cowboys marked an 8–0 start to the season for the Steelers, the best in franchise history.

On November 10, 2020, Roethlisberger was placed on the reserve/COVID-19 after being deemed high risk due to Vance McDonald contracting COVID-19 but was activated four days later. In Week 10, against the Cincinnati Bengals, he had 333 passing yards and four passing touchdowns in the 36–10 victory. Roethlisberger was named the AFC Offensive Player of the Week for his performance. In Week 13 against the Washington Football Team, Roethlisberger threw for 305 yards, two touchdowns and an interception during the 23–17 loss. This was the Steelers' first loss of the season.

Roethilsberger finished the 2020 season with 3,803 passing yards, 33 touchdowns, and ten interceptions as the Steelers finished 12–4 with an AFC North title. Against the Cleveland Browns in the Wild Card Round, Roethlisberger completed 47 passes off 68 attempts, for 501 yards and four touchdowns, but threw four interceptions in a 48–37 loss. Roethlisberger's 47 pass competitions set an NFL record for most completions in a game (passing Drew Bledsoe and Jared Goff's record of 45 passes) while also throwing for the second most passing yards ever in a playoff game.

2021 season: Final season

Roethlisberger signed a renegotiated contract with the Steelers on March 4, 2021, that saw him take a $5 million pay cut. A day before the Week 10 game against the Detroit Lions, the Steelers placed Roethlisberger on Reserve/COVID-19 list after testing positive for the virus. In the 2021 season, Roethlisberger threw for with 3,740 passing yards, 22 touchdowns, and ten interceptions, and also had an additional rushing touchdown as the Steelers finished the season with a 9–7–1 record. In the Wild Card Round against the Kansas City Chiefs, Roethlisberger threw for 215 yards and two touchdowns in the 42–21 loss.

On January 27, 2022, Roethlisberger announced his retirement from the NFL.

After Tampa Bay Buccaneers quarterback Tom Brady unretired in March of that year, some wondered if Roethlisberger would also come back for another season. Roethlisberger was quick to silence those questions when he told WDVE Radio in Pittsburgh "First off, my coach and GM don't want me back. Second off, I'm pretty content with where I'm at."

NFL career statistics

Regular season

Postseason

Super Bowl

Comebacks/game-winning drives 
Roethlisberger set an NFL rookie record in 2004 with five comeback wins in the fourth quarter, and six game-winning drives in the fourth quarter/overtime (including one playoff game). Roethlisberger has the most comeback wins (19) and game-winning drives (25) through the first seven seasons of a player's career. He is the only quarterback in NFL history to reach 20 comeback wins before the age of 30. Upon his retirement following the 2021 season, Roethlisberger was tied for the 2nd most game-winning drives of all time (53), and in sole possession of 2nd most game-winning drives including the playoffs (57).

NFL records
 Most regular season wins in a season, rookie QB – 13 (2004)
 Longest regular season win streak to start a career for an NFL QB – 15 games (won all 13 starts in the 2004 season, won first 2 games of the 2005 season)
 Most wins as a starting quarterback in first five NFL seasons (reg. season only) – 51 (from 2004 to 2008)
 Highest completion percentage, rookie season – 66.4% (2004) (Since broken by Dak Prescott)
 Highest single-game completion percentage, rookie season (min. 20 attempts) – 84.0% (completed 21/25 at Dallas October 17, 2004) (Since broken by Dak Prescott)
 First QB to start two Conference Championship games in first two seasons in the NFL (2004 and 2005)
 Youngest starting QB ever to win the Super Bowl (2005; second-youngest QB to play in the Super Bowl, behind Dan Marino)
 Second quarterback in NFL history, along with Peyton Manning, to register three perfect passing games during the regular season, and the only quarterback to ever register two perfect passing games in one regular season.
 Lowest passer rating for a Super Bowl winning QB – 22.6 (completed 9 of 21 passes for zero touchdowns with two interceptions)
 Most yards passing in relief (379 yards on November 15, 2015, against the Cleveland Browns)
 Most consecutive 6+ touchdown pass games (2)
 Most TD passes in consecutive games (12)
 Most career 500+ yard passing games (4)
 Most career perfect passer rating games (4) (tied with Peyton Manning)
 Most completions in a regular or postseason game (47 on January 10, 2021, against the Cleveland Browns)
 Most passes attempted, postseason game (68 on January 10, 2021, against the Cleveland Browns)

Pittsburgh Steelers franchise records
In his 18 seasons, Roethlisberger has many individual accomplishments that are record performances in Steelers history.

On October 11, 2012, he passed Terry Bradshaw for most passing yards for a Steelers quarterback.

On December 8, 2013, he passed Terry Bradshaw for most passing touchdowns for a Steelers quarterback.

Career records
 165–81-1 (.671) record as starting QB (includes a 13–10 playoff record)
 Highest passer rating (Min. 20 attempts) – 93.5
 Highest completion percentage (Min. 20 attempts)— 64.4%
 Longest pass completion – 97-yard touchdown to JuJu Smith-Schuster on October 29, 2017, against the Detroit Lions and November 25, 2018, against the Denver Broncos
 Most pass attempts – 8,443
 Most pass completions – 5,440
 Most times sacked – 554
 Most 200+ yard passing games – 188 (includes nine playoff games)
 Most 300+ yard passing games – 68 (includes one playoff game)
 Most consecutive games with 300+ yards passing – 4 (from November 8, 2015, through December 12, 2015)
 Most 400+ yard passing games – 12
 Most 500+ yard passing games – 4
 Most 3,000-yard passing seasons – 15 (2006–2018, 2020, 2021)
 Most consecutive 3,000-yard passing seasons – 13 (2006–2018)
 Most 4,000-yard passing seasons – 6 (2009, 2011, 2013, 2014, 2017, 2018)
 Most consecutive 4,000-yard passing seasons – 2 (2013–2014, 2017–2018)
 Most 3 TD passing games – 45 (includes one playoff game)
 Most 4 TD passing games – 16
 Most 5 TD passing games – 6
 Most 6 TD passing games – 2
 Most consecutive games with a TD pass – 30 (from September 9, 2012, through September 7, 2014)
 Most consecutive home games with a TD pass – 45 (from December 19, 2010, through September 17, 2017)
 Most 4th quarter comeback wins – 41
 Most game-winning drives – 53
 Most games with a passer rating over 100.0 (regular season; min. 10 attempts) – 84 (includes four playoff games)
 Most games with a perfect passer rating – 4
 Most games with 40+ pass attempts – 52 (includes five playoff games)
 Most games with 20+ completions – 119 (includes nine playoff games)
 Most games with 30+ completions – 22 (includes two playoff games)
 Longest tenure by a quarterback to spend his career with a single team in NFL history – 18 seasons

Season records
 Highest completion percentage – 67.1% (2014)
 Most touchdown passes – 34 (2018)
 Highest touchdown pass percentage – 7.92% (2007)
 Highest yards per attempt – 8.90 (2005)
 Highest passer rating – 104.1 (2007)
 Most passing yards – 5,129 (2018)
 Most 200+ yard passing games – 16 (2018)
 Most 300+ yard passing games – 9 (2014)
 Most 400+ yard passing games – 2 (2009, 2014, 2018)
 Most 500+ yard passing games – 1 (2009, 2014, 2017)
 Most 3+ TD passing games – 5 (2007, 2009, 2018)
 (Tie) Most 4+ TD passing games – 3 (2007)
 Most pass completions – 452 (2018)
 Lowest interception percentage – 1.29% (2010; 5 INTs on 389 attempts)
 Fewest interceptions (Min. 10 attempts/game) – 5 (2010)

Single-game records
 Most passing yards – 522 (Completed 40 of 49 passes for 522 yards and 6 touchdowns on October 26, 2014, against the Indianapolis Colts)
 Most pass completions – 44 (Completed 44 of 66 passes for 506 yards on December 10, 2017, against the Baltimore Ravens)
 (Tie) Most consecutive passes completed, single game – 15 (Completed 15 straight on November 26, 2007, against the Miami Dolphins. Bubby Brister also completed 15 straight on October 1, 1989, against the Detroit Lions.)
 Highest completion percentage, game (min. 20 attempts) – 85.7% (Completed 18 out of 21 attempts on November 26, 2007, against the Miami Dolphins)
 Most touchdown passes, game – 6 (Threw six TD passes against the Indianapolis Colts on October 26, 2014, and again the following week on November 2, 2014, against the Baltimore Ravens)

Rookie records (achieved during 2004 season)
 Most pass attempts – 295
 Most pass completions – 196
 Highest completion percentage – 66.4%
 Most passing yards – 2621
 Most touchdown passes – 17
 Highest yards per attempt – 8.88
 Highest passer rating – 98.1
 Wins as starting quarterback – 13

Postseason records
 Highest completion percentage (Min. 50 attempts) – 61.3%
 Highest passer rating – 84.5

Charitable works
Roethlisberger started a foundation with the following mission statement: "The Ben Roethlisberger Foundation seeks to (a): provide support for police and fire departments throughout the United States with a particular emphasis on service dogs and (b): to enhance the quality of life for residents of Findlay, Ohio and Pittsburgh, Pennsylvania."

In 2005, Roethlisberger donated one game check to aid the tsunami relief fund. He has also donated over $100,000 to fund police dogs in Pittsburgh.

In October 2014, Roethlisberger and his wife donated $1 million to his alma mater, Miami University, for an indoor sports center.

Personal life

Roethlisberger was born in Lima, Ohio, the son of Ida Jane (née Foust) and Kenneth Todd "Ken" Roethlisberger. His father is a former pitcher and quarterback at Georgia Tech. He is of part Swiss descent; his surname, Roethlisberger (Swiss-German spelling: Röthlisberger), is of Swiss origin, with roots in Geissbühl, a farming hamlet in the municipality of Lauperswil, Switzerland. His younger sister, Carlee Roethlisberger, played basketball for the University of Oklahoma.

On July 23, 2011, Roethlisberger married Ashley Harlan, a physician assistant from New Castle, Pennsylvania. He and his wife have three children, Ben Jr., Baylee, and Bodie.

Roethlisberger is a Christian. Roethlisberger grew up as a Christian but recommitted to his faith in 2017. Roethlisberger has said "Go ahead and be the best athlete you can possibly be, and see if you can be a better Christian. That's what I'm trying to do now. I'm trying to be a better Christian than I am athlete and football player."

Roethlisberger is a spokesman for Swiss Roots, a campaign intended to help Americans of Swiss origin reconnect with their Swiss ancestral heritage. In May 2006, Roethlisberger and his family traveled to Switzerland for a week.

He has his own line of barbecue sauce, Big Ben's BBQ, and is an investor in tech startups, including neonatal care company, NeoLight.

Controversy

Motorcycle accident
On June 12, 2006, Roethlisberger was in a motorcycle accident near downtown Pittsburgh, in which he was not wearing his helmet. Roethlisberger did not have a valid Pennsylvania motorcycle license at the time of the accident, only a temporary permit that he had obtained after moving to Pittsburgh that had expired in March.

Roethlisberger was traveling east on Second Avenue when a 1996 Chrysler New Yorker made a left turn in front of the motorcycle on the South Tenth Street Bridge when the accident occurred. According to an eyewitness, Roethlisberger went over the handlebars of his bike, shattering the windshield of the car with his head. Reports from the scene and news media indicated that the accident was serious but "not life- or career-threatening," though Roethlisberger  related in interviews that paramedics on the scene stopped bleeding in his throat just in time to save his life. Roethlisberger was transported to Mercy Hospital and was described as being in "serious but stable" condition in the operating room.

Police sources indicated that Roethlisberger suffered fractures to the jaw and right sinus cavity, as well as a nine-inch laceration to the back of the head, the loss of two teeth, and several chipped teeth.

At Mercy Hospital, he went immediately into surgery to repair the broken bones in his face. A subsequent news conference with the hospital staff was brief but confirmed early reports that the most serious injuries were to the head and face. After surgery on June 13 2006, Roethlisberger was upgraded to fair condition.

The most serious injuries to Roethlisberger were a broken upper and lower jaw and a broken nose. 

Roethlisberger was released from the hospital on June 14, 2006. The next day, he released a statement apologizing for concerning friends, family, all his fans, and the Steelers organization, and in which he also stated, "If I ever ride again, it certainly will be with a helmet." Roethlisberger was subsequently videotaped by KDKA-TV staff riding without a helmet on a Pittsburgh freeway.

On June 19, the Pittsburgh police announced that Roethlisberger was to be cited for failure to wear a helmet and failure to operate in his license class. Wearing a helmet is optional in Pennsylvania only for operators who possess and have had a motorcycle license for at least two years. The driver of the car was cited for failure to yield the right of way.

Roethlisberger gave his first television interview after the accident on July 13, with ABC's Good Morning America. Despite the seriousness of the accident, his recovery went so well that he started the first three Steelers preseason games in 2006.

Sexual assault allegations

Lake Tahoe
In July 2009, Andrea McNulty, 31, filed a civil claim in Washoe County, Nevada District Court accusing Roethlisberger of sexually assaulting in June 2008 in his hotel room while he was in Stateline, Nevada for a celebrity golf tournament. Roethlisberger was one of nine defendants listed in the docket report and Roethlisberger's attorney denied the claim.

The Lake Tahoe suit sought damages from the quarterback and additional damages from Harrah's Lake Tahoe officials, alleging that they covered up the incident. According to McNulty, she was working as an executive casino host in July 2008 when she said Roethlisberger struck up a friendly conversation at her desk during the tournament. The next night she claimed Roethlisberger telephoned her to tell her that the television sound system in his room was not working and asked her to look at it. McNulty said she determined that the TV was functioning properly, but as she turned to leave, he stood in front of the door and blocked her, then grabbed her and started to kiss her. According to the lawsuit, the woman obtained hospital treatment after the incident. A second lawsuit filed by a Harrah's employee related to an incident involving Roethlisberger four days earlier showed that Roethlisberger was friends with a Harrah's executive overseeing northern Nevada. McNulty's suit alleges that her boss told her "That guy [Roethlisberger] can have anyone he wants."

In August 2009, the Pittsburgh Post-Gazette published details of an affidavit filed as part of a motion by two of the other defendants named in the suit to relocate the case from Washoe County to Douglas County. In the affidavit, Angela Antonetti, McNulty's former co-worker, delivered a sworn statement that McNulty had bragged to her about having consensual sex with Roethlisberger. As part of the affidavit, Antonetti said she was "absolutely shocked" upon hearing of the case on the radio on July 21. Antonetti explained, "I knew that [her] lawsuit and false allegations would unfairly and unjustly hurt Mr. Roethlisberger".

According to the affidavit, defendant Antonetti claimed that McNulty had revealed she was hoping she had gotten pregnant with a "little Roethlisberger". Antonetti also claimed that she had been asked to travel to Pittsburgh, Pennsylvania in August 2008 in an attempt to "run into" the quarterback. In response, Antonetti advised McNulty she "shouldn't try to chase Mr. Roethlisberger".

In December 2011, the suit was ended when the parties settled.

Milledgeville, Georgia
On March 5, 2010, it was revealed that police in Milledgeville, Georgia investigated Roethlisberger for assault inside the women's restroom of the Capital City nightclub. The accuser, a then-20-year-old student at nearby Georgia College & State University, was seen at several establishments with Roethlisberger leading up to the incident, including posing for a photograph with him. Roethlisberger spoke with police the night of the incident and stated that he did have contact with the woman that was not "consummated" and afterward the accuser slipped and injured herself.

Roethlisberger hired lawyer Ed Garland, who previously defended Baltimore Ravens linebacker Ray Lewis in his murder trial. Head coach Mike Tomlin stated at the time that he was "highly concerned" for the franchise and Roethlisberger.

The accuser was treated at Oconee Regional Medical Center. An emergency-room doctor and two nurses examined her and noted in their report a "superficial laceration and bruising and slight bleeding in the genital area", but could not say if trauma or assault was the cause. The remaining examination was "normal". A rape kit was collected, but no semen was recovered. The doctor's report also quoted the alleged victim telling them that, "A boy kind of raped me."

In interviews with the police on the night of the incident, the woman alleged that Roethlisberger, after inviting her and her friends to the V.I.P. area of the nightclub, encouraged them to take shots of alcohol before Anthony Barravecchio – an off-duty Coraopolis, Pennsylvania policeman, undercover DEA narcotics officer at Pittsburgh International Airport, and one of Roethlisberger's bodyguards – claimed he led her down a hallway and left. Witnesses, however, stated that Barravecchio "placed his hand" on the accuser's shoulder and applied "a little bit of pressure to guide her" t0 the restroom where she claims the assault took place, something Barravecchio's lawyer denies.

After Barravecchio's purported departure, Roethlisberger allegedly approached, exposed himself, and despite the woman's protests, followed her into what turned out to be a bathroom when she tried to leave through the first door she saw. The woman claims Roethlisberger raped her and further alleged that friends of the woman attempted to intervene out of worry, but the second of Roethlisberger's bodyguards, Edward Joyner—an off-duty Pennsylvania State Trooper—avoided eye contact and said he did not know what they were talking about. The policemen claimed to "have no memory" of meeting the woman.

Milledgeville Police Sergeant Jerry Blash, who had posed for a photograph with Roethlisberger earlier in the evening, was the first officer to respond. Blash later admitted denigrating the accuser and never formally questioning Roethlisberger; he did speak to the NFL player and his off-duty police bodyguards at the Capital City club.

In April 2010, district attorney Fred Bright announced that Roethlisberger would not be charged. Further, the accuser wrote to the D.A. through her lawyer expressing she no longer wanted to pursue criminal charges because the level of media attention would make a criminal trial too "intrusive" of a personal experience but stressed that she was not recanting her accusation.

As a result of the unabridged details revealed in Bright's press conference Steelers president Art Rooney II was reported to be "furious". The owner of Pittsburgh-based PLB Sports, which marketed "Big Ben's Beef Jerky", terminated the company's five-year sponsorship of Roethlisberger, the first such action in the company's 14-year history. Jerry Blash resigned from the Milledgeville Police on April 15, 2010. Anthony Barravecchio was never disciplined, despite a local investigation where the Coraopolis Solicitor reviewed the 500-page Georgia Bureau of Investigation file on the matter; however, Barravecchio's interview with the GBI was not among those released by the agency. Ed Joyner was prohibited by the Pennsylvania State Troopers from continuing to work for Roethlisberger, and lost a grievance case seeking to overturn the decision.

2010 suspension
Roethlisberger was suspended for four games during the 2010 NFL season for violating the league's personal conduct policy. Roethlisberger was ordered to undergo a league-mandated "professional behavior evaluation" and "must adhere to any counseling or treatment that is recommended by the professional evaluators." The suspension was subsequently reduced to four games.

In popular culture

Roethlisberger is the namesake of multiple sandwiches, which are usually named using a pun on his last name's similarity to "burger" or "hamburger". For instance, the Pittsburgh restaurant chain Peppi's sells the "Roethlisburger", at a price of $7.00, in correlation with his jersey number "7", and also having ingredients that describe his playing style (scrambled eggs for "scrambler", beef and sausage for his size and strength). A Findlay, Ohio, restaurant named Tony's and an Oxford, Ohio, restaurant named Brick Street also sell "Roethlisburger" sandwiches.

Roethlisberger was among the celebrities lampooned in the 14th-season premiere of the Comedy Central animated series South Park, appearing in a rehabilitation class for "sex addicts" along with David Letterman and Bill Clinton. Titled "Sexual Healing", the episode aired shortly after the second accusation of assault.

He has appeared on the Late Show with David Letterman after both of his Super Bowl victories. At the 2006 Grammy Awards, one week after Pittsburgh won Super Bowl XL, Roethlisberger introduced Kelly Clarkson. In 2009, he hosted WWE Raw. He, along with other Steelers players, made a cameo appearance as a member of the Gotham Rogues football team in the 2012 film The Dark Knight Rises.

See also
 List of 500-yard passing games in the National Football League
 List of National Football League career passer rating leaders
 List of National Football League career quarterback wins leaders
 List of NFL quarterbacks who have posted a perfect passer rating
 List of National Football League quarterback playoff records

References

Additional sources
 Staff (September 2006) "Ben Roethlisberger 1982–" Biography Today 15(3): pp. 102–117

External links

 
 
 
 

1982 births
Living people
American bloggers
American Conference Pro Bowl players
American football quarterbacks
American male bloggers
American people of Swiss-German descent
American philanthropists
Findlay High School alumni
Miami RedHawks football players
National Football League controversies
National Football League Offensive Rookie of the Year Award winners
People from Findlay, Ohio
Pittsburgh Steelers players
Players of American football from Ohio
Sportspeople from Lima, Ohio
Unconferenced Pro Bowl players
Ed Block Courage Award recipients